Ingelise Driehuis (born 17 September 1967) is a former professional tennis player from the Netherlands.

Biography
Driehuis played collegiate tennis in the United States, first at Clemson University, before transferring to the University of Florida in 1987. She is a member of the Clemson Athletic Hall of Fame.

In the early 1990s she competed as a professional, mainly in doubles, with a best ranking of 87 in the world. As a singles player her most notable achievement was qualifying for the main draw of the 1991 Australian Open, where she lost a close first-round match to Andrea Leand, 6–8 in the third set. She was a regular in the doubles draws of grand slam tournaments and made the quarter-finals of the women's doubles at the 1994 Wimbledon Championships, partnering Maja Murić.

She now works as a lawyer and runs her own firm in Wassenaar.

ITF finals

Singles: 1 (1–0)

Doubles: 28 (16-12)

References

External links
 
 
 

1967 births
Living people
Dutch female tennis players
Clemson Tigers women's tennis players
Florida Gators women's tennis players